The Leo Friedlander Studio is a historic home and artist's studio located in Greenburgh, Westchester County, New York. It was built in 1908 by the Roman Bronze Works and is a -story building built of concrete block covered in stucco.  It features classical style details, a copper-covered gable roof, a bank of skylights, and two brick chimneys. It was the residence and studio of Leo Friedlander (1890–1966) from the 1930s until his death.  It was originally the home and studio of Henry Merwin Shrady and then Karl Ilava.

It was added to the National Register of Historic Places in 1982.

See also
National Register of Historic Places listings in southern Westchester County, New York

References

Houses on the National Register of Historic Places in New York (state)
Neoclassical architecture in New York (state)
Houses completed in 1908
Houses in Westchester County, New York
National Register of Historic Places in Westchester County, New York
1908 establishments in New York (state)